Hogue, Inc., is an American company that manufactures and distributes firearms accessories and related products.  Founded in 1968 in California, and now based in Henderson, Nevada, the company is best known for its pistol grips.

History

The company was founded by Guy Hogue in 1968, after he started making pistol grips that would properly fit his hand. As a member of the Los Angeles Police Department, Hogue also started making grips for fellow officers. His grips became so popular that he retired from his job in law enforcement to focus on his own business.

The company has expanded over time and now provides grips for at least 16 different brands of handguns, manufactured in four different Hogue facilities. Grips are produced in rubber and in wood, in multiple colors and textures. The company also makes holsters and rifle stocks. In 2011, the company started producing knives, which led to a move of its headquarters to Nevada, "due in large part to a California statute that prohibits the manufacturing of automatic knives."

Upon Guy Hogue's retirement, leadership of the company passed to two of his sons, Aaron and Patrick.

References

External links
 
 Grip Upgrade - Hogue Monogrip S&W 629 44 magnum Installation and Review via YouTube
 Smith and Wesson J-Frame Revolver Hogue Grip Installation via YouTube

Companies based in Henderson, Nevada
1968 establishments in California
Firearm commerce